Sarchat or Sar Chat may refer to:
Sarchat-e Badhava, Kohgiluyeh and Boyer-Ahmad Province